The Middle Bengali Literature is a period in the history of Bengali literature dated from 15th to 18th centuries. Following the Turkic Muslim conquest of Bengal in the 13th century, literature in vernacular Bengali began to take shape. The oldest example of Middle Bengali Literature is believed to be Shreekrishna Kirtana by Boru Chandidas.

The Middle Bengali Literature is divided into three periods, named Pre-Chaitanya Era, Chaitanya Era, and Later Middle Age.

In the Pre-Chaitanya Era (15th century), the early Vaishnava Poetry or the Vaishnava Padavali by Chandidas and Vidyapati was composed, the first translations of Rāmāyana and Bhagavata in Bengali were made, and the tradition of Mangalkāvya flourished with Manasamangal and Chandimangal.

In the Chaitanya Era (16th-17th century), the later Vaishnava Poetry and the hagiography of Sri Chaitanya flourishes. In this period, the translation of Mahābhārata into Bengali grows, and important development in Mangalkāvya tradition is seen.

In the Later Middle Age, the tradition of Shakta Poetry or Shakta Padāvali grows. The age of Mangalkavya meets its end with the composition of Annadamangal by Bharatchandra Ray. The Baul tradition emerges as an intellectual icon with Lalan Fakir. The most important development is the rapid growth of Eastern Bengal Ballads and Muslim Ghazals are among the most important aspects of this period, particularly the work of poets like Alaol and Daulat Qazi.

Bengali-language literature
Medieval Bengal